Amanda Lillian Muggleton (born 12 October 1951) is an English Australian theatre, television and film actress.  She is best known for her supporting television soap opera role in Prisoner as Chrissie Latham, with appearance between 1979 and 1983. 

Her stage work in Australia includes the title roles in Shirley Valentine and Educating Rita, and as Maria Callas in Master Class, for which she won the 2002 Helpmann Award for Best Actress in a Play. She won a second Helpmann Award in 2005, for her role as Mercedes Cortez in the musical Eureka!.

Early life
Muggleton was born in Stepney, London, England and emigrated to Australia in 1974.  She attended Sydenham School and left just before taking A Levels to go to Drama School. She trained at London's Guildhall School of Music and Drama and the Royal Academy of Dance.

Career

Television and film
Muggleton's most famous television role is perhaps that of Chrissie Latham in the Australian soap opera Prisoner. Other roles include Connie Ryan in Richmond Hill, and guest roles in television series including A Country Practice, Cop Shop, HeadLand, City Homicide as well as British series Hollyoaks and the telemovie Sara Dane.  Film credits include Mad Max, Thirst, Street Hero, Queen of the Road, Mr. Reliable, Feeling Sexy, Idiot Box and Matching Jack.

In June 2019, it was announced that Muggleton would begin appearing in the Seven Network soap opera Home and Away as recurring character Wendy Shaw, mother of Ryan "Robbo" Shaw (Jake Ryan). She made her first appearance on 27 June 2019 during the show's thirty-second season. She is currently appearing in the 2020 season.

Theatre
Muggleton appeared with all the State and commercial theatre companies. On stage, her performances with State theatre companies include Privates on Parade, The Matchmaker, The Seagull, Shirley Valentine (MTC), Master Class, Nicholas Nickleby, The Rise and Fall of Little Voice, Soulmates (STC), Duet for One, The Winter's Tale, Gigi, We Were Dancing (QTC), Twelfth Night, Blithe Spirit (SATC), Educating Rita, Medea and Shirley Valentine (Hole in the Wall, Perth).

Muggleton's commercial credits include HMS Pinafore (Essgee), Hello Dolly (The Production Company), The Book Club, Master Class (ICA), Annie (GFO/SEL/Macks), the original Steaming (Morley, Davis), Eureka! (Essgee) and Losing Louis (Ensemble Theatre). Muggleton has won several very significant awards, for Shirley Valentine, The Rise and Fall of Little Voice (Norman Kessell Award) and for Miss Hannigan in Annie (Colleen Clifford Award). For her role as Maria Callas in Master Class, she won a Green Room Award and a Helpmann Award for Best Actress in a Play. She won a second Helpmann Award for Best Supporting Actress in a Musical for her role as Mercedes Cortez in the Australian musical, Eureka!

In 2003, Muggleton completed a highly successful national tour of The Lion, the Witch and the Wardrobe, playing the White Witch with Dennis Olsen as The Professor. Muggleton and Olsen also devised and co-produced Marvellous Party!, a production that celebrates the words and music of Noël Coward, and which had two sell-out shows at the Concert Hall in the Victorian Arts Centre, a highly successful Victorian tour and has been seen at Capers, Melbourne (2003 and 2004), Friends Restaurant (Hyatt) Perth, Edwards Waterfront Mandurah WA (2004) and Canberra's Teatro Vivaldi (2004). She also appeared in her own solo cabaret show, which premiered at the Star Casino Showroom, and which will tour nationally.

Out of Marvellous Party! came Darling It's Noel, produced by International Concert Attractions and directed by Rodney Fisher at the Sydney Opera House in May 2004 and at His Majesty's Theatre, Perth in June 2004. Muggleton is qualified as a speech and drama teacher.  She is also a public speaker and can pilot single-engine planes.

Muggleton ended 2008 with a nomination at the AFI Awards. Her role of Kathy Booth in City Homicide earned her the nomination for Best Guest or Supporting Actress in a Television Drama.

In 2009, Muggleton and her business partner Bernadette Eichner founded Scene & Heard, a new acting school based in Sydney's Lane Cove. Within its first year, the business became so successful that they had to relocate it to new, bigger premises. Muggleton has also appeared in the thirtieth anniversary of The Man From Mukinupin for Belvoir Street Theatre, Sydney (2009) and in the two roles Louis and Ethel Reid in The Ruby Sunrise for Ensemble Theatre, Sydney (2009).

In 2010, Muggleton has appeared as Bette Davis in the one-woman show Me & Jezebel at the Mackay Entertainment Centre (QLD). One week after it finished, she began rehearsals for the role of Chris in Calendar Girls, which toured nationally and took the role of Lillian in Madagascar for Black Swan Theatre Company in Perth, WA (October 2010). She also appeared in two episodes of the ABC series The Librarians.

In 2011, Muggleton started playing multiple roles in Love Loss & What I Wore at the Sydney Opera House alongside Magda Szubanski and Natalie Bassingthwaighte. Subsequently, she played the role of Susan in a one-woman comedy Just the Ticket for Ensemble Theatre, Sydney (March 2011). After a short break, Muggleton took over the role of Mrs Peachum in The Threepenny Opera alongside Paul Capsis for the Sydney Theatre Company, from 1 September 2011 to 24 September 2011, and then headed to Perth (WA), where she played the role of Mrs Johnstone in Blood Brothers, from 9 November 2011 to 4 December 2011 – a role that she had longed to play.

In March 2012, Muggleton went to Queensland for a role in Fatal Honeymoon, a feature film based on the death of Alabama woman Tina Watson on her Great Barrier Reef diving trip in 2003, shot for the American cable channel Lifetime.

In 2013, Muggleton starred in three different theatre productions. First she starred in a revival of Torch Song Trilogy for Gaiety Theatre Presents, from 6 February to 3 March at the Darlinghurst Theatre in Sydney. Following this, she took to the road for a six-month tour of The Book Club which visited Brisbane, Sydney, Melbourne, Adelaide, Perth and many regional areas. Midway through the tour she took a break to reprise her role in Blood Brothers at Brisbane's Cremorne Theatre, QPAC for two weeks in August. In 2014 she returned to the role of Ms Hannigan in Annie (Sydney) as well as performing the cabaret show The Men Who Got Away—Thank God! in Canberra.

In 2015, Muggleton performed in Boston Marriage at QPAC in February and March and won the 2015 Norman Kessell Memorial Award for Best Actor (female) for her role in The Book Club at the Glug Awards in Sydney.

Muggleton returned to the stage in 2016 to play Velma Von Tussle in Hairspray in Brisbane (April) and Newcastle (July) just before The Book Club returned to Melbourne's Southbank Theatre in July. Muggleton also added two TV credits to her name; she appeared in Episode 2 of Channel 7's The Secret Daughter and in December 2016, Muggleton made a brief appearance in the UK Channel 4 soap opera Hollyoaks as Dr. Barton which she filmed in October whilst she was in London performing The Book Club at The Kings Head Theatre.

In 2017, Muggleton played the role of Helena Rubinstein in Lip Service for The Ensemble Theatre in Sydney and reprised her award-winning role as Maria Callas in Master Class in Perth. Master Class opens in Melbourne in January 2018.

Filmography

STAGE/THEATRE
 Volte Farce (1975) (UK)
 Fefu And Her Friends (1975) (UK)
 Cheskoo Raree (1976) (UK)
 Privates On Parade (1976) (UK)
 Boy For You, Girl For Me (1977)
 Bremen Coffee (1977)
 MacBeth (1978)
 Sadie And Neco (1978)
 Zazu And Zercus (1978)
 Kennedy's Children (1978)
 Love Thy Neighbour (1978)
 Nicholas Nickleby (1979)
 Hello And Goodbye (1979)
 Antigone (1980)
 Dirty Linen (1980)
 Female Parts (1981)
 Female Transport (1981)
 Steaming (1981-1982;1988)
 Zastrozzi (1982)
 Education (1983)
 Words Words Words (1983)
 Measure For Measure (1984)
 Duet For One (1985)
 The Matchmaker (1985)
 Mothers And Fathers (1985)
 The Secret Diary Of Adrian Mole (1985-1986)
 Crystal Clear (1986)
 Private Lives (1987;1990)
 Shirley Valentine (1987;1991)
 Educating Rita (1988;1991)
 The Odd Couple (1988)
 Steaming (1988)
 Stepping Out (1989)
 Bedroom Farce (1989)
 Private Lives (1990)
 Shirley Valentine (1991-1992)
 Educating Rita (1991)
 Love Letters (1991;1992)
 Shirley Valentine (1992-1993;1995)
 The Rise And Fall Of Little Voice (1993;1994)
 Don't Dress For Dinner (1994)
 A Winter's Tale (1994)
 Gigi (1994)
 Shirley Valentine (1995;1998)
 The Secret Diary Of Adrian Mole (1996)
 HMS Pinafore (1997)
 Master Class (1998;1999)
 Shirley Valentine (1998)
 Full Gallop (1998)
 Dangerous Obsession (1998)
 A Funny Thing Happened On The Way To The Forum (1998-1999)
 Master Class (1999)
 Blithe Spirit (2000)
 The Seagull (2001)
 Twelfth Night (?)
 Medea (?)
 Hello Dolly! (2002)
 Soulmates (2002)
 We Were Dancing (2003)
 The Lion, The Witch And The Wardrobe (2003)
 Marvellous Party! (2003)
 Darling It's Noel (2004)
 Eureka! (2005)
 Losing Louis (2006)
 The Man From Mukinupin (2009)
 The Ruby Sunrise (2009)
 Me And Jezebel (2010)
 Calendar Girls (2010)
 Madagascar (2010)
 Love Loss And What I Wore (2011)
 Just The Ticket (2011)
 The Threepenny Opera (2011)
 Blood Brothers (2011;2013)
 Torch Song Trilogy (2013)
 The Book Club (2013;2016) (UK)
 Blood Brothers (2013)
 Annie (2014)
 The Men Who Got Away - Thank God! (2014)
 Boston Marriage (2015)
 Hairspray (2016)
 The Book Club (2016) (UK)
 Lip Service (2017)
 Master Class (2018)
 CORAL BROWNE: This F***king Lady (2019) (UK)
 The Mentor (2023)

References

External links
 

Alumni of the Guildhall School of Music and Drama
Australian film actresses
Australian soap opera actresses
Australian musical theatre actresses
English film actresses
English television actresses
English soap opera actresses
English stage actresses
English musical theatre actresses
Helpmann Award winners
People from Stepney
Living people
20th-century Australian actresses
20th-century English actresses
21st-century Australian actresses
21st-century English actresses
1951 births